Gary Colson (born April 30, 1934) is an American basketball coach and executive. The Logansport, Indiana native guided several college men's basketball teams, including Valdosta State University, Pepperdine University, University of New Mexico and California State University, Fresno. He compiled a 563–385 (.594) record over 34 seasons of coaching between 1959 and 1995. In 2002, he joined the Memphis Grizzlies' front office as Assistant to the President of Basketball Operations. Currently, Coach Colson is a basketball instructor at the University of California, Santa Barbara. 
Georgia Sports Hall Of Fame Basketball Coach Gary Colon http://georgiasportshalloffame.com/site/uncategorized/the-64th-annual-georgia-sports-hall-of-fame-induction-ceremony/
Coach Colson earned his bachelor's degree in Health and Physical Education from David Lipscomb College (now Lipscomb University) in 1956. He was inducted into the Lipscomb Athletics Hall of Fame in 1998 in the "Athlete" category.

References

1934 births
Living people
American men's basketball players
Basketball coaches from Indiana
College men's basketball head coaches in the United States
Fresno State Bulldogs men's basketball coaches
Lipscomb Bisons baseball players
Lipscomb Bisons men's basketball players
Memphis Grizzlies executives
New Mexico Lobos men's basketball coaches
People from Logansport, Indiana
Pepperdine Waves men's basketball coaches
Valdosta State Blazers men's basketball coaches